The George Westinghouse Award, named after George Westinghouse, was given by the American Society for Engineering Education (ASEE) for outstanding contributions to engineering education. It was awarded to "a young engineering educator of outstanding ability to recognize and encourage his or her contributions to improving engineering teaching".

The award was established by the Westinghouse Foundation in 1946, last issued in 1999 and consisted of an honorarium and a certificate.

Recipients
The following people received the George Westinghouse Award:

 1940: Ray A. Simpson  - Hoover Dam
 1946: James N. Goodier
 1947: B. Richard Teare, Jr.
 1948: Hunter Rouse
 1949: Joseph Marin
 1950: Rolf Eliassen
 1951: Glenn Murphy
 1952: Gordon S. Brown
 1953: Edward F. Obert
 1954: Thomas J. Higgins
 1955: Robert R. White
 1956: Milton C. Shaw
 1957: Robert E. Greybal
 1958: Willis W. Harman
 1959: Max S. Peters
 1960: R. Byron Bird
 1961: David C. White
 1962: Paul M. Naghdi
 1963: Mac E. Van Valkenburg
 1964: Cedomir M. Sliepcevich
 1965: John G. Truxal
 1966: Ali B. Cambel
 1967: Charles L. Miller
 1968: Klaus D. Timmerhaus
 1969: Arthur E. Bryson, Jr.
 1970: Ali A. Seireg
 1971: Charles E. Wales
 1972: Jack P. Holman
 1973: Martin D. Bradshaw
 1974: Joseph Bordogna
 1975: Donald G. Childers
 1976: Jerome B. Cohen
 1977: Roger A. Schmitz
 1978: C. Judson King
 1979: J. Michael Duncan
 1980: William B. Krantz
 1981: Leroy S. "Skip" Fletcher
 1982: Stephen J O'Brien
 1983: Frank P. Incropera
 1984: Phillip C. Wankat
 1985: Sunder H. Advani
 1986: Gerald W. Clough
 1987: John H. Seinfeld
 1988: Thomas F. Edgar
 1989: Kenneth E. Case
 1990: Y.A. Liu
 1991: Magdy F. Iskander
 1992: Nicholas A. Peppas
 1993: Rajendra Singh
 1994: Gretchen Kalonji
 1995: Denice Denton
 1996: C. Stewart Slater
 1997: Cristina H. Amon
 1998: James P. Schaffer
 1999: Pradeep K. Khosla

See also

 List of engineering awards

References

External links
 Westinghouse's principal foundation for the company's social investments.

Education awards
Engineering awards
American Society for Engineering Education